The Green Bay Packers are a professional American football franchise based in Green Bay, Wisconsin.  They are currently members of the North Division of the National Football Conference (NFC) in the National Football League (NFL), and are the third-oldest franchise in the NFL.  Founded in 1919 by coach, player, and future Hall of Fame inductee Curly Lambeau and sports and telegraph editor George Whitney Calhoun, the Packers organization has become one of the most successful professional football teams, having won a total of 12 professional American football championships—nine NFL Championships and three Super Bowls—the most in the NFL.  The franchise has recorded 18 NFL divisional titles, eight NFL conference championships, and the second most regular season and overall victories of any NFL franchise, behind the Chicago Bears.

From the inaugural season in 1919 to the completion of the 2007 NFL season, 1493 NFL players have played at least one regular season or playoff game for the Green Bay Packers.  26 of these individuals have been inducted into the Pro Football Hall of Fame, while 109 have been inducted into the Green Bay Packers Hall of Fame (22 players have been inducted into both).

Key

Players

L

{| class="wikitable sortable" style="text-align: center;" width = 68%;
|-
!width=15%|Player name
!width=7%|Position
!width=20%|College
!width=15%|Seasons
!width=6%|Games
|-
|style="text-align:left;"|
|DE
|style="text-align:left;"|Oregon
|1995
|14
|-
|style="text-align:left;"|
|RB
|style="text-align:left;"|Alabama
|2013–16
|51
|-
|style="text-align:left;"|
|HB
|style="text-align:left;"|No College
|1921
|1
|-
|style="text-align:left;"|
|LB
|style="text-align:left;"|Cornell
|1976
|2
|-
|style="text-align:left;"|
|B
|style="text-align:left;"|Notre Dame
|1921–29
|77
|-
|style="text-align:left;"|
|TE
|style="text-align:left;"|Texas
|1972
|12
|-
|style="text-align:left;"|
|FB
|style="text-align:left;"|Clark
|1978–79
|13
|-
|style="text-align:left;"|
|P
|style="text-align:left;"|Towson State
|1998
|16
|-
|style="text-align:left;"|
|RB
|style="text-align:left;"|Utah State
|1972–74
|41
|-
|style="text-align:left;"|
|G
|style="text-align:left;"|Eastern Michigan
|2009–16
|
|-
|style="text-align:left;"|
|FB
|style="text-align:left;"|St. Mary's (California)
|1943
|3
|-
|style="text-align:left;"|
|TE
|style="text-align:left;"|Colorado State
|1980
|9
|-
|style="text-align:left;"|
|C
|style="text-align:left;"|Notre Dame
|1925
|13
|-
|style="text-align:left;"|
|LB
|style="text-align:left;"|Michigan State
|1991
|13
|-
|style="text-align:left;"|
|LB
|style="text-align:left;"|Penn State
|1982
|8
|-
|style="text-align:left;"|
|DT
|style="text-align:left;"|Arizona State
|1979–80
|17
|-
|style="text-align:left;"|
|E
|style="text-align:left;"|Detroit
|1922
|2
|-
|style="text-align:left;"|
|C
|style="text-align:left;"|Alabama
|1956–57
|18
|-
|style="text-align:left;"|
|LB
|style="text-align:left;"|Ohio State
|1983
|15
|-
|style="text-align:left;"|
|B
|style="text-align:left;"|Texas Christian
|1939
|3
|-
|style="text-align:left;"|
|B
|style="text-align:left;"|Iowa
|1934–45
|120
|-
|style="text-align:left;"|
|G
|style="text-align:left;"|Heidelberg
|1925–26
|19
|-
|style="text-align:left;"|
|FB
|style="text-align:left;"|East Carolina
|2004–06
|23
|-
|style="text-align:left;"|
|LB
|style="text-align:left;"|Clemson
|2005
|3
|-
|style="text-align:left;"|
|E
|style="text-align:left;"|Wisconsin
|1921, 23
|2
|-
|style="text-align:left;"|
|T
|style="text-align:left;"|Alabama
|1937–42, 46
|53
|-
|style="text-align:left;"|
|WR
|style="text-align:left;"|Central Florida
|2000–01
|22
|-
|style="text-align:left;"|
|TE
|style="text-align:left;"|Mississippi State
|2005–07
|45
|-
|style="text-align:left;"|
|DT
|style="text-align:left;"|Oregon State
|2004
|9
|-
|style="text-align:left;"|
|CB
|style="text-align:left;"|Washington
|1980–90
|157
|-
|style="text-align:left;"|
|DB
|style="text-align:left;"|Auburn
|2008–11
|32
|-
|style="text-align:left;"|
|RB
|style="text-align:left;"|Middle Tennessee State
|2005
|7
|-
|style="text-align:left;"|
|RB
|style="text-align:left;"|No College
|1974
|10
|-
|style="text-align:left;"|
|DE
|style="text-align:left;"|Stanford
|1987
|1
|-
|style="text-align:left;"|
|LB
|style="text-align:left;"|Richmond
|2002–05
|64
|-
|style="text-align:left;"|
|LB
|style="text-align:left;"|Notre Dame
|1986
|12
|-
|style="text-align:left;"|
|C
|style="text-align:left;"|Texas Christian
|1937–38
|16
|-
|style="text-align:left;"|
|G
|style="text-align:left;"|San Francisco
|1936–42, 46
|71
|-
|style="text-align:left;"|
|RB
|style="text-align:left;"|Georgia Tech
|1994–2001
|102
|-
|style="text-align:left;"|
|B
|style="text-align:left;"|Nebraska
|1924–32
|102
|-
|style="text-align:left;"|
|LB
|style="text-align:left;"|Southern Mississippi
|1981–84
|57
|-
|style="text-align:left;"|
|TE
|style="text-align:left;"|Texas-Arlington
|1981–84
|44
|-
|style="text-align:left;"|
|TE
|style="text-align:left;"|UCLA
|2018
|
|-
|style="text-align:left;"|
|TE
|style="text-align:left;"|Texas A&M
|1985–87
|18
|-
|style="text-align:left;"|
|NT
|style="text-align:left;"|Arkansas A&M
|1980
|10
|-
|style="text-align:left;"|
|WR
|style="text-align:left;"|Florida State
|1992–94
|21
|-
|style="text-align:left;"|
|CB
|style="text-align:left;"|Pittsburgh
|1983–86
|51
|-
|style="text-align:left;"|
|FB
|style="text-align:left;"|Minnesota
|1926, 29–30
|26
|-
|style="text-align:left;"|
|T
|style="text-align:left;"|Richmond
|2018–19
|
|-
|style="text-align:left;"|
|C
|style="text-align:left;"|Ohio State
|2014–20
|
|-
|style="text-align:left;"|
|T
|style="text-align:left;"|Tennessee
|1945–49
|57
|-
|style="text-align:left;"|
|S
|style="text-align:left;"|Miami
|2005
|4
|-
|style="text-align:left;"|
|K
|style="text-align:left;"|Western Michigan
|1970
|14
|-
|style="text-align:left;"|
|WR
|style="text-align:left;"|Stanford
|1978–86
|136
|-
|style="text-align:left;"|
|NT
|style="text-align:left;"|Pittsburgh
|1987
|2
|-
|style="text-align:left;"|
|G
|style="text-align:left;"|Ohio State
|1952–53
|19
|-
|style="text-align:left;"|
|FB
|style="text-align:left;"|Samford
|1928
|3
|-
|style="text-align:left;"|
|LB
|style="text-align:left;"|Alabama
|1998
|1
|-
|style="text-align:left;"|
|WR
|style="text-align:left;"|Wichita
|1964–67
|35
|-
|style="text-align:left;"|
|K
|style="text-align:left;"|California
|1997–2005
|144
|-
|style="text-align:left;"|
|B
|style="text-align:left;"|La Crosse St. Teachers
|1951–53
|33
|-
|style="text-align:left;"|
|HB
|style="text-align:left;"|Miami
|1956
|12
|-
|style="text-align:left;"|
|LS
|style="text-align:left;"|Old Dominion
|2015
|2
|-
|style="text-align:left;"|
|TE
|style="text-align:left;"|Princeton
|2020
|
|-
|style="text-align:left;"|
|DE
|style="text-align:left;"|Northwestern
|2016–present
|
|-
|style="text-align:left;"|
|WR
|style="text-align:left;"|Alabama State
|2005
|1
|-
|style="text-align:left;"|
|FB
|style="text-align:left;"|Miami
|2003–04
|27
|-
|style="text-align:left;"|
|DT
|style="text-align:left;"|Baylor
|1955
|12
|-
|style="text-align:left;"|
|G
|style="text-align:left;"|Arizona
|1968–74
|90
|-
|style="text-align:left;"|
|E
|style="text-align:left;"|Tulsa
|1945–49
|56
|-
|style="text-align:left;"|
|DB
|style="text-align:left;"|Ohio State
|1975–80
|90
|-
|style="text-align:left;"|
|K
|style="text-align:left;"|Connecticut
|1969
|4
|-
|style="text-align:left;"|
|E
|style="text-align:left;"|Minnesota
|1922–23
|11
|-
|style="text-align:left;"|
|T
|style="text-align:left;"|California-Los Angeles
|1941
|5
|-
|style="text-align:left;"|
|DT/DE
|style="text-align:left;"|Marshall
|1998–2002
|59
|-
|}

M

{| class="wikitable sortable" style="text-align: center;" width = 68%;
|-
!width=15%|Player name
!width=7%|Position
!width=20%|College
!width=15%|Seasons
!width=6%|Games
|-
|style="text-align:left;"|
|NT
|style="text-align:left;"|Pittsburgh
|1993
|14
|-
|style="text-align:left;"|
|LB
|style="text-align:left;"|Minnesota
|1973
|10
|-
|style="text-align:left;"|
|WR
|style="text-align:left;"|Notre Dame
|1966
|8
|-
|style="text-align:left;"|
|T
|style="text-align:left;"|Kansas State
|1935
|1
|-
|style="text-align:left;"|
|QB
|style="text-align:left;"|Virginia
|1987–92
|68
|-
|style="text-align:left;"|
|LB
|style="text-align:left;"|Louisiana State
|1987
|3
|-
|style="text-align:left;"|
|B
|style="text-align:left;"|Notre Dame
|1921
|6
|-
|style="text-align:left;"|
|T
|style="text-align:left;"|Michigan State
|1989–91
|45
|-
|style="text-align:left;"|
|DB
|style="text-align:left;"|California-Davis
|1987–88
|6
|-
|style="text-align:left;"|
|G
|style="text-align:left;"|Oklahoma
|1950–51
|24
|-
|style="text-align:left;"|
|E
|style="text-align:left;"|Michigan
|1950–54
|38
|-
|style="text-align:left;"|
|K
|style="text-align:left;"|North Dakota
|1968
|2
|-
|style="text-align:left;"|
|WR
|style="text-align:left;"|Stanford
|1998
|3
|-
|style="text-align:left;"|
|LB
|style="text-align:left;"|Michigan
|2005
|15
|-
|style="text-align:left;"|
|LB
|style="text-align:left;"|N. C. State
|2012
|
|-
|style="text-align:left;"|
|DB
|style="text-align:left;"|Wisconsin
|1987
|3
|-
|style="text-align:left;"|
|S
|style="text-align:left;"|Florida
|2006
|16
|-
|style="text-align:left;"|
|K
|style="text-align:left;"|Hillsdale
|1972–80
|102
|-
|style="text-align:left;"|
|B
|style="text-align:left;"|Indiana
|1928
|11
|-
|style="text-align:left;"|
|DT
|style="text-align:left;"|Stephen F. Austin State
|1965
|14
|-
|style="text-align:left;"|
|LB/FB
|style="text-align:left;"|Oklahoma
|2001–04
|51
|-
|style="text-align:left;"|Herman Martell
|E
|style="text-align:left;"|No College
|1921
|1
|-
|style="text-align:left;"|
|DE
|style="text-align:left;"|Livingston
|1984–87
|48
|-
|style="text-align:left;"|
|TE
|style="text-align:left;"|Tennessee
|2001–06
|70
|-
|style="text-align:left;"|
|DB
|style="text-align:left;"|Wyoming
|2009–10
|21
|-
|style="text-align:left;"|
|QB
|style="text-align:left;"|Furman
|2006
|1
|-
|style="text-align:left;"|
|WR
|style="text-align:left;"|Saginaw Valley State
|2006–07
|28
|-
|style="text-align:left;"|
|LB
|style="text-align:left;"|Stanford
|2016–19
|
|-
|style="text-align:left;"|
|DE
|style="text-align:left;"|Xavier
|1951–56
|72
|-
|style="text-align:left;"|
|DT
|style="text-align:left;"|Miami
|2000
|16
|-
|style="text-align:left;"|
|DB
|style="text-align:left;"|Nebraska
|1974
|12
|-
|style="text-align:left;"|
|E
|style="text-align:left;"|Western Michigan
|1942–45
|41
|-
|style="text-align:left;"|
|RB
|style="text-align:left;"|Troy State
|1988
|15
|-
|style="text-align:left;"|
|DE
|style="text-align:left;"|Texas
|1957–58
|14
|-
|style="text-align:left;"|
|T
|style="text-align:left;"|Michigan State
|1957–64
|104
|-
|style="text-align:left;"|
|P
|style="text-align:left;"|Kentucky
|2010–15
|
|-
|style="text-align:left;"|
|NT
|style="text-align:left;"|Arizona
|1987
|2
|-
|style="text-align:left;"|
|B
|style="text-align:left;"|Indiana
|1922–26
|47
|-
|style="text-align:left;"|
|G
|style="text-align:left;"|Oregon
|1975
|14
|-
|style="text-align:left;"|
|DB
|style="text-align:left;"|Texas A&I
|1970–75
|84
|-
|style="text-align:left;"|
|WR
|style="text-align:left;"|Delta State
|1988–89
|20
|-
|style="text-align:left;"|
|LB
|style="text-align:left;"|Southern California
|2009–18
|
|-
|style="text-align:left;"|
|B
|style="text-align:left;"|St. Mary's (California)
|1936
|2
|-
|style="text-align:left;"|
|LB
|style="text-align:left;"|Tulsa
|1958
|3
|-
|style="text-align:left;"|
|G
|style="text-align:left;"|Notre Dame
|1927
|10
|-
|style="text-align:left;"|
|WR
|style="text-align:left;"|Notre Dame
|1996–98
|29
|-
|style="text-align:left;"|
|RB
|style="text-align:left;"|Utah State
|2017
|8
|-
|style="text-align:left;"|
|LB
|style="text-align:left;"|North Carolina
|1999
|3
|-
|style="text-align:left;"|
|HB
|style="text-align:left;"|Beloit
|1926
|8
|-
|style="text-align:left;"|
|RB
|style="text-align:left;"|Missouri
|1973
|1
|-
|style="text-align:left;"|
|CB/S
|style="text-align:left;"|California-Los Angeles
|1999–2002
|61
|-
|style="text-align:left;"|
|C
|style="text-align:left;"|Southern California
|1975
|11
|-
|style="text-align:left;"|
|C
|style="text-align:left;"|Illinois
|1973–84
|162
|-
|style="text-align:left;"|
|LB
|style="text-align:left;"|Florida
|2000
|1
|-
|style="text-align:left;"|
|CB
|style="text-align:left;"|Colorado
|1992
|5
|-
|style="text-align:left;"|
|WR
|style="text-align:left;"|Navy
|1986
|4
|-
|style="text-align:left;"|
|DB
|style="text-align:left;"|Colorado
|1976–83
|110
|-
|style="text-align:left;"|
|DT
|style="text-align:left;"|Notre Dame
|1970–76
|94
|-
|style="text-align:left;"|
|B
|style="text-align:left;"|Georgia
|1929–33
|52
|-
|style="text-align:left;"|
|G
|style="text-align:left;"|UCF
|2017–18
|
|-
|style="text-align:left;"|
|G
|style="text-align:left;"|Indiana
|1935
|1
|-
|style="text-align:left;"|
|B
|style="text-align:left;"|Miami
|1947
|1
|-
|style="text-align:left;"|
|G
|style="text-align:left;"|St. John's (Minn.)
|1964
|12
|-
|style="text-align:left;"|
|S
|style="text-align:left;"|Montana
|1997
|1
|-
|style="text-align:left;"|
|S
|style="text-align:left;"|New Mexico
|1998–2000
|44
|-
|style="text-align:left;"|
|G
|style="text-align:left;"|St. Joseph's (Ind.)
|1987
|2
|-
|style="text-align:left;"|
|G
|style="text-align:left;"|Beloit
|1926
|1
|-
|style="text-align:left;"|
|DT
|style="text-align:left;"|North Dakota State
|1950
|12
|-
|style="text-align:left;"|
|FB
|style="text-align:left;"|Mississippi
|1992
|4
|-
|style="text-align:left;"|
|E
|style="text-align:left;"|Tulane
|1954, 1957–67
|148
|-
|style="text-align:left;"|
|TE
|style="text-align:left;"|Elon
|1970–78
|116
|-
|style="text-align:left;"|
|CB
|style="text-align:left;"|Arizona State
|1994–95
|21
|-
|style="text-align:left;"|
|DE
|style="text-align:left;"|Tulane
|1987
|3
|-
|style="text-align:left;"|
|CB
|style="text-align:left;"|Kent State
|1989
|2
|-
|style="text-align:left;"|
|C
|style="text-align:left;"|Notre Dame
|1996
|8
|-
|style="text-align:left;"|
|QB
|style="text-align:left;"|Arkansas
|1959–60
|24
|-
|style="text-align:left;"|
|TE
|style="text-align:left;"|Penn State
|2004
|1
|-
|style="text-align:left;"|
|HB
|style="text-align:left;"|Southern Methodist
|1957–59
|36
|-
|style="text-align:left;"|
|G
|style="text-align:left;"|Georgia
|1994
|10
|-
|style="text-align:left;"|
|P
|style="text-align:left;"|Jackson State
|1991–92
|25
|-
|style="text-align:left;"|
|B
|style="text-align:left;"|Texas
|1944–47
|35
|-
|style="text-align:left;"|
|DE/LB
|style="text-align:left;"|Ball State
|1996–99, 2002
|62
|-
|style="text-align:left;"|
|CB
|style="text-align:left;"|Memphis
|1999–2004
|70
|-
|style="text-align:left;"|
|G
|style="text-align:left;"|Tennessee
|1999–2000
|19
|-
|style="text-align:left;"|
|LB
|style="text-align:left;"|Massachusetts
|1979
|3
|-
|style="text-align:left;"|
|G
|style="text-align:left;"|Virginia
|1941
|8
|-
|style="text-align:left;"|
|B
|style="text-align:left;"|No College
|1921
|3
|-
|style="text-align:left;"|
|DB
|style="text-align:left;"|Montana State
|1984–85
|20
|-
|style="text-align:left;"|
|QB
|style="text-align:left;"|Brigham Young
|1995–96
|6
|-
|style="text-align:left;"|
|DT
|style="text-align:left;"|Morningside
|1977
|8
|-
|style="text-align:left;"|
|DT
|style="text-align:left;"|Texas
|1994
|16
|-
|style="text-align:left;"|
|T
|style="text-align:left;"|Illinois
|1975
|12
|-
|style="text-align:left;"|
|S
|style="text-align:left;"|Maine
|2012–13
|28
|-
|style="text-align:left;"|
|FB
|style="text-align:left;"|Florida
|1992–93
|32
|-
|style="text-align:left;"|
|B
|style="text-align:left;"|St. John's
|1929–33, 35–36
|75
|-
|style="text-align:left;"|
|T
|style="text-align:left;"|Nebraska
|1943–45
|14
|-
|style="text-align:left;"|
|FB
|style="text-align:left;"|Penn State
|1982–83
|18
|-
|style="text-align:left;"|
|RB
|style="text-align:left;"|Louisiana State
|2001–02
|14
|-
|style="text-align:left;"|
|E
|style="text-align:left;"|Kentucky
|1958, 1960
|24
|-
|style="text-align:left;"|
|LB
|style="text-align:left;"|Wisconsin
|1987
|1
|-
|style="text-align:left;"|
|G
|style="text-align:left;"|Wayne State
|1986
|6
|-
|style="text-align:left;"|
|RB
|style="text-align:left;"|Yale
|1967–69
|22
|-
|style="text-align:left;"|
|K
|style="text-align:left;"|Northern Arizona
|1968–69
|16
|-
|style="text-align:left;"|
|DE
|style="text-align:left;"|California-Davis
|1979–83
|59
|-
|style="text-align:left;"|
|LB
|style="text-align:left;"|Minnesota
|1982
|4
|-
|style="text-align:left;"|
|LB
|style="text-align:left;"|Pacific
|1993
|2
|-
|style="text-align:left;"|
|FB
|style="text-align:left;"|Marquette
|1963
|11
|-
|style="text-align:left;"|
|RB/KR
|style="text-align:left;"|Texas
|2002
|1
|-
|style="text-align:left;"|
|Rb
|style="text-align:left;"|Wisconsin
|1974
|1
|-
|style="text-align:left;"|
|K
|style="text-align:left;"|Kentucky
|1971
|10
|-
|style="text-align:left;"|
|G
|style="text-align:left;"|Washington & Lee
|1951
|12
|-
|style="text-align:left;"|
|G
|style="text-align:left;"|Penn State
|1929–35, 37
|95
|-
|style="text-align:left;"|
|T
|style="text-align:left;"|Southern California
|1996–97
|24
|-
|style="text-align:left;"|
|WR
|style="text-align:left;"|Florida A&M
|1994–97
|47
|-
|style="text-align:left;"|
|RB
|style="text-align:left;"|Memphis State
|1977–81
|71
|-
|style="text-align:left;"|
|DE
|style="text-align:left;"|Minnesota
|1940
|7
|-
|style="text-align:left;"|
|DE
|style="text-align:left;"|Indiana
|1954
|3
|-
|style="text-align:left;"|
|QB
|style="text-align:left;"|Cal Poly-San Luis Obispo
|1975
|7
|-
|style="text-align:left;"|
|DE
|style="text-align:left;"|Washington State
|1992
|2
|-
|style="text-align:left;"|
|B
|style="text-align:left;"|Southern Methodist
|1954
|1
|-
|style="text-align:left;"|
|LB
|style="text-align:left;"|Mississippi State
|1987
|1
|-
|style="text-align:left;"|
|T
|style="text-align:left;"|Boston College
|1960
|5
|-
|style="text-align:left;"|
|C
|style="text-align:left;"|Purdue
|1938
|11
|-
|style="text-align:left;"|
|B
|style="text-align:left;"|South Dakota State
|1936–38
|32
|-
|style="text-align:left;"|
|E
|style="text-align:left;"|Hampden-Sydney
|1946
|2
|-
|style="text-align:left;"|
|B
|style="text-align:left;"|Penn State
|1922–23
|17
|-
|style="text-align:left;"|
|G
|style="text-align:left;"|Iowa
|1928–29
|18
|-
|style="text-align:left;"|
|FB
|style="text-align:left;"|Pittsburgh
|2006
|10
|-
|style="text-align:left;"|
|RB
|style="text-align:left;"|Texas Christian
|1999–2000
|17
|-
|style="text-align:left;"|
|B
|style="text-align:left;"|Tulsa
|1946
|2
|-
|style="text-align:left;"|
|CB/S
|style="text-align:left;"|Texas Tech
|1991–94
|48
|-
|style="text-align:left;"|
|WR
|style="text-align:left;"|Fresno State
|1986
|4
|-
|style="text-align:left;"|
|E
|style="text-align:left;"|Loyola (California)
|1951
|2
|-
|style="text-align:left;"|
|B
|style="text-align:left;"|Michigan
|1928–32
|45
|-
|style="text-align:left;"|
|T/G
|style="text-align:left;"|Nevada
|2006–07
|25
|-
|style="text-align:left;"|
|LB
|style="text-align:left;"|South Carolina
|1987
|2
|-
|style="text-align:left;"|
|B
|style="text-align:left;"|Michigan State
|1933–38
|62
|-
|style="text-align:left;"|
|DB
|style="text-align:left;"|Mississippi State
|1979
|3
|-
|style="text-align:left;"|
|DE
|style="text-align:left;"|Texas A&M
|2005–07
|32
|-
|style="text-align:left;"|
|RB
|style="text-align:left;"|Stanford
|2015–18
|36
|-
|style="text-align:left;"|
|E
|style="text-align:left;"|Texas A&M
|1939
|5
|-
|style="text-align:left;"|
|C/G
|style="text-align:left;"|Wooster
|1984–85
|27
|-
|style="text-align:left;"|
|DE
|style="text-align:left;"|Southern California
|1987
|4
|-
|style="text-align:left;"|
|S
|style="text-align:left;"|San Diego State
|2000
|3
|-
|style="text-align:left;"|
|DT
|style="text-align:left;"|Villanova
|1969–70
|20
|-
|style="text-align:left;"|
|HB
|style="text-align:left;"|Vanderbilt
|1960–65
|78
|-
|style="text-align:left;"|
|G
|style="text-align:left;"|San Diego State
|1985–93
|108
|-
|style="text-align:left;"|
|RB
|style="text-align:left;"|Oklahoma State
|2006–07
|26
|-
|style="text-align:left;"|
|DB
|style="text-align:left;"|Syracuse
|1977
|14
|-
|style="text-align:left;"|
|WR
|style="text-align:left;"|Tennessee
|1993–96
|37
|-
|style="text-align:left;"|
|DB
|style="text-align:left;"|Kansas State
|1987
|11
|-
|style="text-align:left;"|
|RB
|style="text-align:left;"|Syracuse
|1987
|2
|-
|style="text-align:left;"|
|WR
|style="text-align:left;"|Oklahoma
|1987
|5
|-
|style="text-align:left;"|
|LB
|style="text-align:left;"|Florida
|2018
|
|-
|style="text-align:left;"|
|LB
|style="text-align:left;"|Michigan State
|1993
|114
|-
|style="text-align:left;"|
|LB
|style="text-align:left;"|North Carolina
|2000
|16
|-
|style="text-align:left;"|
|B
|style="text-align:left;"|Lake Superior State
|1951–52
|20
|-
|style="text-align:left;"|
|LB
|style="text-align:left;"|Tulane
|2012
|
|-
|style="text-align:left;"|
|WR/KR
|style="text-align:left;"|Iowa State
|2002
|2
|-
|style="text-align:left;"|
|B
|style="text-align:left;"|Alabama
|1945–46
|8
|-
|style="text-align:left;"|
|QB
|style="text-align:left;"|Illinois
|1948
|6
|-
|style="text-align:left;"|
|LB
|style="text-align:left;"|Iowa
|1993
|2
|-
|style="text-align:left;"|
|B
|style="text-align:left;"|Georgia
|1933
|3
|-
|style="text-align:left;"|
|DT
|style="text-align:left;"|Kent State
|2007
|3
|-
|style="text-align:left;"|
|CB/S
|style="text-align:left;"|Grambling State
|1995–97
|38
|-
|style="text-align:left;"|
|E
|style="text-align:left;"|Utah State
|1938–41, 45–46
|46
|-
|style="text-align:left;"|
|C
|style="text-align:left;"|Northern Arizona
|1938
|5
|-
|style="text-align:left;"|
|S
|style="text-align:left;"|West Liberty State
|1980–85, 87–91
|147
|-
|style="text-align:left;"|
|WR
|style="text-align:left;"|Texas A&M
|2005
|3
|-
|style="text-align:left;"|
|T
|style="text-align:left;"|Marquette
|1921–24
|22
|-
|}

N
{| class="wikitable sortable" style="text-align: center;" width = 68%;
|-
!width=15%|Player name
!width=7%|Position
!width=20%|College
!width=15%|Seasons
!width=6%|Games
|-
|style="text-align:left;"|
|G
|style="text-align:left;"|Notre Dame
|1922
|8
|-
|style="text-align:left;"|
|QB
|style="text-align:left;"|Northwestern State
|2003–04, 07
|7
|-
|style="text-align:left;"|
|E
|style="text-align:left;"|Georgia
|1928–32
|53
|-
|style="text-align:left;"|
|LB
|style="text-align:left;"|Colorado
|2003–04
|31
|-
|style="text-align:left;"|
|DT/T
|style="text-align:left;"|Tulane
|1945–51
|68
|-
|style="text-align:left;"|
|WR
|style="text-align:left;"|Fort Hays State
|1987
|12
|-
|style="text-align:left;"|
|DE
|style="text-align:left;"|Purdue
|2010–15
|68
|-
|style="text-align:left;"|
|NT
|style="text-align:left;"|Pittsburgh
|1984
|16
|-
|style="text-align:left;"|
|NT
|style="text-align:left;"|Miami
|1988–90
|46
|-
|style="text-align:left;"|
|WR
|style="text-align:left;"|Kansas State
|2008–17
|
|-
|style="text-align:left;"|
|LB
|style="text-align:left;"|Penn State
|1998–99
|16
|-
|style="text-align:left;"|
|G/T
|style="text-align:left;"|Fresno State
|1986–88, 92
|38
|-
|style="text-align:left;"|
|T
|style="text-align:left;"|Texas Christian
|2011–13
|47
|-
|style="text-align:left;"|
|CB
|style="text-align:left;"|Arizona State
|1995–98
|46
|-
|style="text-align:left;"|
|G
|style="text-align:left;"|Rice
|1951
|9
|-
|style="text-align:left;"|
|LB
|style="text-align:left;"|California
|2002
|16
|-
|style="text-align:left;"|
|C
|style="text-align:left;"|Michigan
|1922–24
|22
|-
|style="text-align:left;"|
|T
|style="text-align:left;"|Virginia Tech
|2020
|
|-
|style="text-align:left;"|
|LB
|style="text-align:left;"|Illinois
|1958–72
|190
|-
|style="text-align:left;"|
|DB
|style="text-align:left;"|Southern Methodist
|1955
|12
|-
|style="text-align:left;"|
|WR
|style="text-align:left;"|Oklahoma
|1980–81
|23
|-
|style="text-align:left;"|
|DB
|style="text-align:left;"|South Carolina
|2022–present
|
|-
|style="text-align:left;"|
|DB
|style="text-align:left;"|California (PA)
|2013
|1
|-
|style="text-align:left;"|
|LB
|style="text-align:left;"|Arizona State
|1985–93
|117
|-
|style="text-align:left;"|
|NT
|style="text-align:left;"|Nebraska
|1992
|6
|-
|style="text-align:left;"|
|E
|style="text-align:left;"|Stanford
|1934
|10
|-
|style="text-align:left;"|
|DB
|style="text-align:left;"|Southern Methodist
|1963–64
|28
|-
|style="text-align:left;"|
|B
|style="text-align:left;"|Hamline
|1925
|10
|-
|style="text-align:left;"|
|QB
|style="text-align:left;"|Kentucky
|1970
|1
|-
|style="text-align:left;"|
|B
|style="text-align:left;"|Michigan
|1946, 1951
|14
|-
|style="text-align:left;"|
|C
|style="text-align:left;"|Kentucky
|1978
|16
|-
|style="text-align:left;"|
|DE
|style="text-align:left;"|Purdue
|2003
|14
|-
|style="text-align:left;"|
|T
|style="text-align:left;"|Macalester
|1974
|13
|- Newman,Mike DB/S 
|}

O
{| class="wikitable sortable" style="text-align: center;" width = 68%;
|-
!width=15%|Player name
!width=7%|Position
!width=20%|College
!width=15%|Seasons
!width=6%|Games
|-
|style="text-align:left;"|
|B
|style="text-align:left;"|Notre Dame
|1928, 32
|21
|-
|style="text-align:left;"|
|T
|style="text-align:left;"|Stanford
|1935
|7
|-
|style="text-align:left;"|
|DE
|style="text-align:left;"|Wisconsin
|1955
|12
|-
|style="text-align:left;"|
|P
|style="text-align:left;"|Miami (FL)
|2022–present
|
|-
|style="text-align:left;"|
|E
|style="text-align:left;"|Minnesota
|1924–30	
|74
|-
|style="text-align:left;"|
|QB
|style="text-align:left;"|Cincinnati
|1950
|1
|-
|style="text-align:left;"|
|LB
|style="text-align:left;"|Marshall
|2001
|2
|-
|style="text-align:left;"|
|LB
|style="text-align:left;"|Penn State
|1980
|12
|-
|style="text-align:left;"|
|CB
|style="text-align:left;"|San Jose State
|1983–84
|11
|-
|style="text-align:left;"|
|QB
|style="text-align:left;"|California-Davis
|2004
|1
|-
|style="text-align:left;"|
|T
|style="text-align:left;"|Brigham Young
|1981
|1
|-
|style="text-align:left;"|
|DT
|style="text-align:left;"|Florida A&M
|1973
|8
|-
|style="text-align:left;"|
|LB
|style="text-align:left;"|Arkansas State
|2017
|
|-
|style="text-align:left;"|
|WR/KR
|style="text-align:left;"|Utah
|1974–79
|75
|-
|style="text-align:left;"|
|T
|style="text-align:left;"|Minnesota
|1946–49
|44
|-
|style="text-align:left;"|
|NT
|style="text-align:left;"|Houston
|1992
|7
|-
|style="text-align:left;"|
|DE
|style="text-align:left;"|Minnesota
|1942
|2
|-
|style="text-align:left;"|
|DT
|style="text-align:left;"|Montana
|1974–75
|28
|-
|style="text-align:left;"|
|CB
|style="text-align:left;"|Oregon
|1993
|2
|-
|style="text-align:left;"|
|E
|style="text-align:left;"|Utah
|1949
|4
|-
|style="text-align:left;"|
|G
|style="text-align:left;"|Minnesota
|1948–49
|16
|-
|style="text-align:left;"|
|E
|style="text-align:left;"|Nevada
|1949–51
|36
|-
|style="text-align:left;"|
|RB
|style="text-align:left;"|North Dakota
|1976
|6
|-
|style="text-align:left;"|
|G
|style="text-align:left;"|Lawrence
|1922
|3
|-
|}

P

{| class="wikitable sortable" style="text-align: center;" width = 68%;
|-
!width=15%|Player name
!width=7%|Position
!width=20%|College
!width=15%|Seasons
!width=6%|Games
|-
|style="text-align:left;"|
|G
|style="text-align:left;"|Missouri
|2006–07
|8
|-
|style="text-align:left;"|
|LB/C
|style="text-align:left;"|Notre Dame
|1957
|9
|-
|style="text-align:left;"|
|T
|style="text-align:left;"|West Virginia
|2017–18
|1
|-
|style="text-align:left;"|
|T
|style="text-align:left;"|Texas A&M
|1941–42, 45	
|22
|-
|style="text-align:left;"|
|B	
|style="text-align:left;"|Iowa	
|1930	
|2
|-
|style="text-align:left;"|
|HB
|style="text-align:left;"|Virginia
|1953
|4
|-
|style="text-align:left;"|
|QB
|style="text-align:left;"|Kentucky
|1952–53, 57–58
|48
|-
|style="text-align:left;"|
|RB
|style="text-align:left;"|Oklahoma
|1999–2000
|19
|-
|style="text-align:left;"|
|RB
|style="text-align:left;"|Mississippi Valley State
|1987
|1
|-
|style="text-align:left;"|
|LB
|style="text-align:left;"|Penn State
|1983
|3
|-
|style="text-align:left;"|
|WR
|style="text-align:left;"|Western Kentucky
|1987
|12
|-
|style="text-align:left;"|
|B
|style="text-align:left;"|Wisconsin
|1941
|7
|-
|style="text-align:left;"|
|QB
|style="text-align:left;"|Nebraska
|1970–72
|4
|-
|style="text-align:left;"|
|G
|style="text-align:left;"|Duke
|2017–21
|
|-
|style="text-align:left;"|
|DE
|style="text-align:left;"|Arizona State
|1988–91, 93
|48
|-
|style="text-align:left;"|
|RB
|style="text-align:left;"|Jackson State
|1979
|6
|-
|style="text-align:left;"|
|C
|style="text-align:left;"|Washington & Jefferson
|1936
|10
|-
|style="text-align:left;"|
|LB
|style="text-align:left;"|Northern Iowa
|1990–94
|64
|-
|style="text-align:left;"|
|WR
|style="text-align:left;"|Langston
|1974–77
|44
|-
|style="text-align:left;"|
|HB
|style="text-align:left;"|Oklahoma
|1952
|2
|-
|style="text-align:left;"|
|T
|style="text-align:left;"|Missouri
|1968–72
|62
|-
|style="text-align:left;"|
|QB
|style="text-align:left;"|N.E. Louisiana
|1996–98, 2001–04
|66
|-
|style="text-align:left;"|
|E
|style="text-align:left;"|Eastern Kentucky
|1951–52
|13
|-
|style="text-align:left;"|
|DE/LB
|style="text-align:left;"|North Carolina
|2014–16
|48
|-
|style="text-align:left;"|
|S
|style="text-align:left;"|Alabama
|2006–08, 2010–11
|24
|-
|style="text-align:left;"|
|TE
|style="text-align:left;"|Maine
|2014–16
|20
|-
|style="text-align:left;"|
|FB
|style="text-align:left;"|Wisconsin–Platteville
|1944–45
|17
|-
|style="text-align:left;"|
|LB
|style="text-align:left;"|Pittsburgh
|1976
|14
|-
|style="text-align:left;"|
|T
|style="text-align:left;"|Alabama
|1927–35
|89
|-
|style="text-align:left;"|
|LB
|style="text-align:left;"|Southern California
|2012–18
|
|-
|style="text-align:left;"|
|DB
|style="text-align:left;"|Minnesota Duluth
|1960
|12
|-
|style="text-align:left;"|
|DE/DT
|style="text-align:left;"|Ohio State
|2003–05
|34
|-
|style="text-align:left;"|
|E
|style="text-align:left;"|Texas
|1932, 34
|20
|-
|style="text-align:left;"|
|B
|style="text-align:left;"|San Francisco
|1937
|2
|-
|style="text-align:left;"|John Petitbon
|DB
|style="text-align:left;"|Notre Dame
|1957
|12
|-
|style="text-align:left;"|
|S
|style="text-align:left;"|Northern Illinois
|1981
|6
|-
|style="text-align:left;"|
|CB
|style="text-align:left;"|Nebraska
|1993
|2
|-
|style="text-align:left;"|
|DT
|style="text-align:left;"|Ohio State
|2006–13
|30
|-
|style="text-align:left;"|
|QB
|style="text-align:left;"|Missouri
|1980
|1
|-
|style="text-align:left;"|
|RB
|style="text-align:left;"|Philander Smith
|1961–69, 71
|126
|-
|style="text-align:left;"|
|CB
|style="text-align:left;"|California-Los Angeles
|1988–90
|44
|-
|style="text-align:left;"|
|DE
|style="text-align:left;"|Gustavus Adolphus
|1986
|1
|-
|style="text-align:left;"|
|LB
|style="text-align:left;"|Vanderbilt
|1987
|3
|-
|style="text-align:left;"|
|WR
|style="text-align:left;"|Catawba
|1968
|3
|-
|style="text-align:left;"|
|RB
|style="text-align:left;"|Bowling Green
|2006
|1
|-
|style="text-align:left;"|
|LB
|style="text-align:left;"|Brigham Young
|2005–10
|44
|-
|style="text-align:left;"|
|G
|style="text-align:left;"|No College
|1921
|4
|-
|style="text-align:left;"|
|LB
|style="text-align:left;"|Grambling State
|1981–85
|73
|-
|style="text-align:left;"|
|G
|style="text-align:left;"|Michigan
|1946
|11
|-
|style="text-align:left;"|
|E
|style="text-align:left;"|Hardin–Simmons
|1946
|2
|-
|style="text-align:left;"|
|WR/KR
|style="text-align:left;"|Mississippi
|1997–98
|17
|-
|style="text-align:left;"|
|S
|style="text-align:left;"|Illinois State
|1993–98
|80
|-
|style="text-align:left;"|
|E
|style="text-align:left;"|Villanova
|1949–50
|20
|-
|style="text-align:left;"|
|P
|style="text-align:left;"|Cal Poly-Pomona
|1985
|9
|-
|style="text-align:left;"|
|B
|style="text-align:left;"|Washington
|1948
|9
|-
|style="text-align:left;"|
|DB
|style="text-align:left;"|Southern California
|1954
|11
|-
|style="text-align:left;"|
|B
|style="text-align:left;"|Beloit
|1926–27
|17
|-
|style="text-align:left;"|
|DL
|style="text-align:left;"|Eastern Michigan
|1972–77
|78
|-
|style="text-align:left;"|
|FB
|style="text-align:left;"|Alcorn A&M
|1957
|9
|-
|}

Q
{| class="wikitable sortable" style="text-align: center;" width = 68%;
|-
!width=15%|Player name
!width=7%|Position
!width=20%|College
!width=15%|Seasons
!width=6%|Games
|-
|style="text-align:left;"|
|TE
|style="text-align:left;"|Penn State
|2010–15
|60
|-
|style="text-align:left;"|
|T
|style="text-align:left;"|Pittsburgh
|1933
|9
|-
|style="text-align:left;"|
|WR
|style="text-align:left;"|Millikin
|1989–91
|48
|-
|style="text-align:left;"|
|DE
|style="text-align:left;"|Michigan State 
|1959–62
|52
|-
|}

R

{| class="wikitable sortable" style="text-align: center;" width = 68%;
|-
!width=15%|Player name
!width=7%|Position
!width=20%|College
!width=15%|Seasons
!width=6%|Games
|-
|style="text-align:left;"|
|E
|style="text-align:left;"|Marquette
|1930–31
|5
|-
|style="text-align:left;"|
|C
|style="text-align:left;"|Colorado
|1987
|3
|-
|style="text-align:left;"|
|DT
|style="text-align:left;"|Boston College
|2009–15
|91
|-
|style="text-align:left;"|
|DB
|style="text-align:left;"|Iowa
|1971
|14
|-
|style="text-align:left;"|
|DB
|style="text-align:left;"|American International
|1977
|14
|-
|style="text-align:left;"|
|E
|style="text-align:left;"|Southern Methodist
|1942
|5
|-
|style="text-align:left;"|
|DB
|style="text-align:left;"|Mississippi Valley State
|1987
|3
|-
|style="text-align:left;"|
|T
|style="text-align:left;"|Vanderbilt
|1938–48
|116
|-
|style="text-align:left;"|
|K
|style="text-align:left;"|Michigan State
|2006
|16
|-
|style="text-align:left;"|
|WR
|style="text-align:left;"|Cal-State, Fullerton
|1987
|1
|-
|style="text-align:left;"|
|B
|style="text-align:left;"|Minnesota
|1922
|5
|-
|style="text-align:left;"|
|FB
|style="text-align:left;"|Iowa
|1952
|12
|-
|style="text-align:left;"|
|HB
|style="text-align:left;"|Georgia
|1950–56
|78
|-
|style="text-align:left;"|
|P
|style="text-align:left;"|Virginia Tech
|1986–87
|6
|-
|style="text-align:left;"|
|DE
|style="text-align:left;"|Florida State
|2001–03
|18
|-
|style="text-align:left;"|
|C/LB
|style="text-align:left;"|Kentucky
|1948–49, 51–52
|45
|-
|style="text-align:left;"|
|RB
|style="text-align:left;"|Baylor
|1991
|6
|-
|style="text-align:left;"|
|DB
|style="text-align:left;"|Pittsburgh
|1988
|10
|-
|style="text-align:left;"|
|E
|style="text-align:left;"|Fordham
|1940–42, 4
|26
|-
|style="text-align:left;"|
|C
|style="text-align:left;"|Syracuse
|1953–63
|131
|-
|style="text-align:left;"|
|FB
|style="text-align:left;"|Oklahoma
|2015–17
|
|-
|style="text-align:left;"|
|QB
|style="text-align:left;"|Louisiana State
|1987
|3
|-
|style="text-align:left;"|
|WR
|style="text-align:left;"|Michigan State
|1996
|5
|-
|style="text-align:left;"|
|G
|style="text-align:left;"|Penn State
|1997–2004
|125
|-
|style="text-align:left;"|
|QB
|style="text-align:left;"|Southern Methodist
|1961–63
|23
|-
|style="text-align:left;"|
|DT
|style="text-align:left;"|North Carolina
|2000
|2
|-
|style="text-align:left;"|
|T
|style="text-align:left;"|East Carolina
|1992–93
|27
|-
|style="text-align:left;"|
|HB
|style="text-align:left;"|Dartmouth
|1956
|4
|-
|style="text-align:left;"|
|HB
|style="text-align:left;"|Lincoln (Mo.)
|1952
|2
|-
|style="text-align:left;"|
|G
|style="text-align:left;"|Morgan State
|1951
|2
|-
|style="text-align:left;"|
|LB
|style="text-align:left;"|Penn State
|1963–72
|127
|-
|style="text-align:left;"|
|S
|style="text-align:left;"|Colgate
|1996–97
|32
|-
|style="text-align:left;"|
|WR
|style="text-align:left;"|North Carolina State
|2006–07
|13
|-
|style="text-align:left;"|
|DE
|style="text-align:left;"|Miami
|2014
|5
|-
|style="text-align:left;"|
|CB
|style="text-align:left;"|Hampton
|1996
|6
|-
|style="text-align:left;"|
|G
|style="text-align:left;"|Texas A&M
|1987
|3
|-
|style="text-align:left;"|
|DE
|style="text-align:left;"|Southern
|1971–76
|83
|-
|style="text-align:left;"|
|QB
|style="text-align:left;"|California
|2005–present
|66+
|-
|style="text-align:left;"|
|TE
|style="text-align:left;"|California
|2014–17
|63
|-
|style="text-align:left;"|
|RB/KR
|style="text-align:left;"|Utah
|1982, 84
|23
|-
|style="text-align:left;"|
|LB
|style="text-align:left;"|Georgia Tech
|2004
|10
|-
|style="text-align:left;"|
|B
|style="text-align:left;"|Nebraska
|1941, 46–47
|25
|-
|style="text-align:left;"|
|DT
|style="text-align:left;"|Kentucky
|1975–78
|48
|-
|style="text-align:left;"|
|S
|style="text-align:left;"|Louisiana State
|2004–05
|32
|-
|style="text-align:left;"|
|HB
|style="text-align:left;"|Alabama
|1955, 58
|16
|-
|style="text-align:left;"|
|T
|style="text-align:left;"|Michigan
|1924, 26–27
|27
|-
|style="text-align:left;"|
|E
|style="text-align:left;"|Texas
|1932–36
|48
|-
|style="text-align:left;"|
|B
|style="text-align:left;"|South Carolina
|1948
|6
|-
|style="text-align:left;"|
|TE
|style="text-align:left;"|Northeastern
|1986
|15
|-
|style="text-align:left;"|
|CB/KR
|style="text-align:left;"|Notre Dame
|2000–01
|22
|-
|style="text-align:left;"|
|QB
|style="text-align:left;"|Rice
|1950–56
|84
|-
|style="text-align:left;"|
|S
|style="text-align:left;"|Virginia Tech
|2007–09
|11
|-
|style="text-align:left;"|
|DB
|style="text-align:left;"|Michigan
|1967–69
|42
|-
|style="text-align:left;"|
|C
|style="text-align:left;"|Montana State
|1982–83
|25
|-
|style="text-align:left;"|
|QB
|style="text-align:left;"|Tulsa
|1995
|1
|-
|style="text-align:left;"|
|LB
|style="text-align:left;"|Michigan State
|1978–80
|33
|-
|style="text-align:left;"|
|C/G
|style="text-align:left;"|Arizona State
|2003–05
|43
|-
|style="text-align:left;"|
|T
|style="text-align:left;"|Southern California
|1985–96
|156
|-
|style="text-align:left;"|
|DT
|style="text-align:left;"|Loras
|1951–53
|20
|-
|style="text-align:left;"|
|DB
|style="text-align:left;"|Dartmouth
|1968–69
|15
|-
|style="text-align:left;"|
|G
|style="text-align:left;"|Michigan
|2020
|
|-
|style="text-align:left;"|
|E
|style="text-align:left;"|Miami
|1953
|11
|-
|style="text-align:left;"|
|G
|style="text-align:left;"|Ohio State
|1952–54
|36
|-
|style="text-align:left;"|
|LB
|style="text-align:left;"|Michigan
|2015–17
|43
|-
|style="text-align:left;"|
|P
|style="text-align:left;"|Regina
|2006–07
|32
|-
|}

See also
List of Green Bay Packers players: A–D
List of Green Bay Packers players: E–K
List of Green Bay Packers players: S–Z

References
General

Specific

L
players